Ma Jiangbao (31 October 1941 – 12 October 2016) was a well known teacher of Wu-style t'ai chi ch'uan. He was the third son of Wu Ying-hua and Ma Yueh-liang.

Biography
In 1986 he came with his father Ma Yueh-liang to Europe to teach Wu-style. Ma Yueh-liang returned home after four months, while Ma Jiangbao took up residence in Rotterdam. He and his students teach in many countries in Europe as well as in South Africa and Japan.

Wu-style was created by a Manchurian named Wu Ch'uan-yu (1834–1902). Wu was a student of Yang Luchan, (founder of the Yang style), and Yang Pan-hou. Wu Ch'uan-yu’s son, Wu Chien-ch'uan (1870-1942), loved martial arts from his youth and studied under the tutorship of his father. After 1912 he continuously developed the teaching t'ai chi ch'uan at the Beijing Sport Research Society, gradually refining his father’s style. His two sons, Wu Kung-i and Wu Kung-tsao, were his first students.

Wu Chien-ch'uan’s eldest daughter, Ma Jiangbao's mother Wu Yinghua (1907–1996), started studying t'ai chi ch'uan with her father at a very young age. In 1935 Wu Yinghua was also appointed deputy director of the Chien-ch'uan Association in Shanghai. She married her father’s student, Ma Yueh-liang (1901–1998), and throughout her life she taught with her husband all over China. In martial arts circles she was regarded as one of the most renowned teachers. Ma Hailong, the eldest son of Wu Ying-hua and Ma Yueh-liang, also studied t'ai chi ch'uan from a young age and is now the president of the Chien-ch'uan Association Shanghai.

References

External links
Ma Jiangbao's Traditional Wu style Taijiquan website

1941 births
2016 deaths
Chinese tai chi practitioners
Manchu martial artists